In Ghana and neighboring countries, tro tro are privately owned minibus share taxis that travel fixed routes leaving when filled to capacity. While there are tro tro stations, these vehicles for hire can also be boarded anywhere along the route.

Operated by a driver and a conductor (who collects money, shouts out the destination, and can also be called a "mate"), many are decorated with slogans and religious sayings. Fewer tro tros operate on Sundays.

The term is believed to derive from the Ga word  tro, "threepence", because the conductors usually asked for "three three pence", which was the standard bus fare in the 1940s, when Ghana still uses the British West African pound and later the Ghanaian pound.

Alternatively, its origin is not "three times three pence" but rather "threepence [thruhpnce, tro] each": doubling a coin's name in the vernacular means "that coin for each person (or item)". Three pence was the price per passenger in the early 1960s, when pounds/shillings/pence were still in use, including threepence coins, before decimalization of the currency into cedi and pesewa in 1965.

Ghana
Used by 70% of Ghanaian commuters, tro tro is the most popular form of transport for work and shopping in the country as of 2010. Large buses also provide public transport in Accra, Ghana, as of 2008 and are patronized by people of different social classes.

Regulation
In Ghana, tro tro are licensed by the government, but the industry is self-regulated. There was no independent transport authority as of 2008 in the capital, Accra.

In the absence of a regulatory environment, groups called syndicates oversee minibus share taxis like tro tro in Africa. These may collect dues, set routes, manage terminals, and fix fares. In Accra as of 2008, such syndicates include GPRTU and PROTOA.

Despite the regulatory challenges, the service would lend itself to some regulation during the COVID-19 pandemic in Ghana. This allowed it to record significant levels (98%) of compliance to guidelines on physical distancing, although guidelines on individual use of face masks were more difficult to enforce.

See also
Dala dala of Tanzania
Matatu of Kenya

Further reading 
 Transport in Ghana
 Ministry of Transport (Ghana)
 Ghana Private Road Transport Union

References

External links 

Share taxis
Road transport in Ghana